Aldo Llambi (born 6 June 1996) is an Albanian professional footballer who plays as a midfielder for Austrian club Raiffeisen Gratkorn.

Club career

Early career
Llambi started his youth career at Flamurtari Vlorë in September 2011. On 12 February 2014 he was loaned out to Teuta Durrës for a half season.

Following his return to Flamurtari Vlorë he made the first team debut under coach Ernest Gjoka on 1 October 2014 in the 2014–15 Albanian Cup match against Kamza coming on as a substitute in the 68th minute in place of Gezim Krasniqi.

Sopoti Librazhd
He made it his debut with Sopoti on 16 September 2015 in an 2015–16 Albanian Cup match against Butrinti Sarandë playing the full 90-minutes match in a 5–0 victory.

International career
Llambi was called up to the Albania national under-19 football team by coach Foto Strakosha for the friendly match against Italy U-19 on 14 May 2014.

Career statistics

Club

References

External links

Aldo Llambi profile FSHF.org

1996 births
Living people
Footballers from Vlorë
Albanian footballers
Albania youth international footballers
Association football midfielders
Flamurtari Vlorë players
KS Sopoti Librazhd players
KF Apolonia Fier players
FC Gratkorn players
Kategoria Superiore players
Kategoria e Parë players
Albanian expatriate footballers
Expatriate footballers in Austria
Albanian expatriate sportspeople in Austria